"Stay the Night" is a song written by Peter Cetera and David Foster for the group Chicago and recorded for their album Chicago 17 (1984), with Cetera singing the lead vocals. The song features noted session drummer Jeff Porcaro taking the place of Chicago drummer Danny Seraphine.

Reception
Cash Box said that the song is very different from Chicago's "vocal harmonies and horns heyday," having "a hard rocking drum beat, some techno-synth backing and an upper-register lead vocal."

Upbeat and rock-oriented, it was the first single released from that album, and reached number 16 on the U.S. Billboard Hot 100 chart.

Music video
This song is also remembered for its music video, filmed in and around the Los Angeles River. It shows Peter Cetera chasing a hard-to-get lady, played by Ingrid Anderson with Debbie Evans as stunt double, and features car-chases, notably featuring a red convertible Oldsmobile 442. It may be that Cetera performed some of his own stunts, but in a 1985 interview, bandmate Robert Lamm said a stuntman was used. It was directed by Bob Giraldi and Gilbert Bettman Jr.

Chart history

References

1984 songs
1984 singles
Chicago (band) songs
Music videos directed by Bob Giraldi
Songs written by David Foster
Songs written by Peter Cetera
Song recordings produced by David Foster
Full Moon Records singles
Warner Records singles